Luciano Darderi and Juan Bautista Torres were the defending champions but only Torres chose to defend his title, partnering Thiago Agustín Tirante. Torres lost in the semifinals to Román Andrés Burruchaga and Facundo Díaz Acosta.

Guido Andreozzi and Guillermo Durán won the title after defeating Burruchaga and Díaz Acosta 6–0, 7–5 in the final.

Seeds

Draw

References

External links
 Main draw

Challenger de Buenos Aires - Doubles
2022 Doubles